Kamasi Washington (born February 18, 1981) is an American jazz saxophonist. He is a founding member of the jazz collective West Coast Get Down.

Career 

Washington was born in 1981 and raised in Los Angeles, California. He is a graduate of the Academy of Music of Alexander Hamilton High School in Beverlywood, Los Angeles. Washington next enrolled in UCLA's Department of Ethnomusicology, where he began playing with faculty members such as Kenny Burrell, Gerald Wilson, and Billy Higgins, who mentored a quartet with Washington, pianist Cameron Graves, and the brothers Stephen ("Thundercat") and Ronald Bruner. They released their debut album Young Jazz Giants in 2004 on Birdman Records.

Washington joined the Gerald Wilson Orchestra for its 2005 album In My Time. Washington played saxophone on Kendrick Lamar's To Pimp a Butterfly. His debut solo recording, The Epic, was released in May 2015. The mini-album/EP Harmony of Difference followed in September 2017. His second full-length studio album, Heaven and Earth, was released in June 2018, with a companion EP titled The Choice released a week later.

Washington has played along with a diverse group of musicians including Wayne Shorter, Herbie Hancock, Horace Tapscott, Lauryn Hill, Nas, Snoop Dogg, George Duke, Chaka Khan, Flying Lotus, Mike Muir, Francisco Aguabella, St. Vincent, the Pan Afrikaan People's Orchestra, Run the Jewels and Raphael Saadiq.

On June 25, 2020, Washington, Terrace Martin, Robert Glasper, and 9th Wonder announced the formation of the supergroup Dinner Party. They released a single, "Freeze Tag", and their debut extended play, Dinner Party, was released on July 10, 2020.

On June 18, 2021, Washington released a new song "Sun Kissed Child" as part of The Undefeated's Music for the Movement series. Also in 2021, Washington and his band contributed a cover of the Metallica song "My Friend of Misery" to the charity tribute album The Metallica Blacklist.

Awards and nominations

Discography

As leader/co-leader 
Studio albums
 Young Jazz Giants with Cameron Graves, Stephen Bruner, Ronald Bruner Jr. (Birdman, 2004)
 Live at 5th Street Dick's (self-released, 2005)
 The Proclamation (self-released, 2007)
 Light of the World (self-released, 2008)
 The Epic (Brainfeeder, 2015)
 Heaven and Earth (Young, 2018)

EPs
 Harmony of Difference (Young, 2017)
 The Choice (Young, 2018)
 Becoming – Music from the Netflix Original Documentary (Young, 2020)
 Dinner Party with Robert Glasper, Terrace Martin, 9th Wonder (Sounds of Crenshaw/Empire, 2020)

With Throttle Elevator Music
 Throttle Elevator Music (Wide Hive, 2012)
 Area J (Wide Hive, 2014)
 Jagged Rocks (Wide Hive, 2015)
 Throttle Elevator Music IV (Wide Hive, 2016)
 Retrorespective (Wide Hive, 2017)
 Emergency Exit (Wide Hive, 2020)
 Final Floor (Wide Hive, 2021)

As sideman 
 Gold by Ryan Adams (Lost Highway, 2001)
 Blackberry Belle by The Twilight Singers (One Little Indian, 2003)
 The Golden Age of Apocalypse by Thundercat – on "Is It Love?" (Brainfeeder, 2011)
 Perseverance by Phil Ranelin (Wide Hive, 2011)
 DreamWeaver by George Duke – on "Ball & Chain" with Teena Marie, and 5 other tracks (Heads Up, 2013)
 Chameleon by Harvey Mason – on "Black Frost" (Concord, 2014)
 Up by Stanley Clarke – on "I Have Something to Tell You Tonight" (Mack Avenue, 2014)
 You're Dead! by Flying Lotus (Warp, 2014)
 To Pimp a Butterfly by Kendrick Lamar – saxophone on "u", string arrangement for "Mortal Man" (Aftermath/Interscope, 2015)
 The Beyond / Where the Giants Roam by Thundercat (Brainfeeder, 2015)
 Run the Jewels 3 by Run the Jewels – on "Thursday in the Danger Room" (Mass Appeal/RED, 2016)
 Drunk by Thundercat (Brainfeeder, 2017)
 Damn by Kendrick Lamar – strings on "Lust" (Top Dawg/Aftermath/Interscope, 2017)
Ash by Ibeyi – on "Deathless" (XL, 2017)
 Masseduction by St. Vincent – on "Pills" (Loma Vista, 2017)

With the Gerald Wilson Orchestra
 In My Time (Mack Avenue, 2005)
 Monterey Moods (Mack Avenue, 2007)
 Detroit (Mack Avenue, 2009)
 Legacy (Mack Avenue, 2011)

References

External links 

 
 
 
 
 

1981 births
Living people
Jazz musicians from California
Musicians from Los Angeles
21st-century American male musicians
21st-century American saxophonists
African-American jazz musicians
American jazz saxophonists
American male saxophonists
Brainfeeder artists
American male jazz musicians
XL Recordings artists
21st-century African-American musicians
20th-century African-American people
Spiritual jazz musicians